Eupithecia sticticata is a moth in the family Geometridae. It is found in Peru.

The wingspan is about 22 mm. The forewings are olive-grey, powdered with fine whitish scales. The lines are very fine, brown and marked by blackish dots on the veins. The hindwings are pale luteous.

References

Moths described in 1907
sticticata
Moths of South America